The 2009–10 St. Louis Blues season was the team's 43rd season in the National Hockey League (NHL).

The Blues fired Andy Murray as head coach on January 2, 2010, after a below expectation record (17–17–6, 40 points), sitting in 12th place in the Western Conference. Especially galling were the frequent blown leads after two periods, and with the poorest home record (6–13–3, including one win in Sweden) in the NHL. Davis Payne was named the Blues' interim head coach, the 23rd head coach in the Blues' history. Payne was previously head coach of the Blues' top minor league affiliate, the Peoria Rivermen of the American Hockey League (AHL). After the season, Payne was named as Head Coach, removing the interim tag.

On January 18, 2010, the Blues hired goaltending consultant Tyler Love.

Keith Tkachuk announced his retirement from professional hockey on April 7, 2010, three days before the final game of the season, April 10, which he declined to play. The Blues saluted him in a tribute after the last home game, his final game ever in the NHL on April 9.

Preseason

Game log

Regular season 

Despite being the most penalized team in the League with 342 power-play opportunities against, the Blues had the best penalty-kill percentage, at 86.84%.

Divisional standings

Conference standings

Game log 

 Green background  indicates win (2 points).
 Red background  indicates regulation loss (0 points).
 White background  indicates overtime/shootout loss (1 point).

Playoffs 

The St. Louis Blues attempted to make the playoffs in back-to-back seasons for the first time since the 2004–05 NHL lockout, but were eliminated with 3 games remaining in the season after the Colorado Avalanche achieved 93 points in locking up the 8th and final playoff spot on April 6, 2010.

Player statistics

Skaters 
(final, April 10, 2010)

Stats

Note: GP = Games played; G = Goals; A = Assists; Pts = Points; +/− = Plus/minus; PIM = Penalty minutes

‡Traded mid-season. Stats reflect time with Blues only. 
†Denotes D'Agostini spent time with another team before joining Blues. Stats reflect time with Blues only.

Goaltenders 
(final, April 10, 2010)

Note: GP = Games played; TOI = Time on ice (minutes); W = Wins; L = Losses; OT = Overtime losses; GA = Goals against; GAA= Goals against average; SA= Shots against; SV= Saves; Sv% = Save percentage; SO= Shutouts

Awards and records

Records

Milestones

Awards

Transactions 

The Blues have been involved in the following transactions during the 2009–10 season.

Trades

Free agents acquired

Free agents lost

Claimed via waivers

Lost via waivers

Player signings

Draft picks 
St. Louis's picks at the 2009 NHL Entry Draft in Montreal on June 26–27, 2009.

See also 

 2009–10 NHL season
 St. Louis Blues seasons
 St. Louis (sports)

Farm teams

Peoria Rivermen 

The Peoria Rivermen are the Blues American Hockey League affiliate in 2009–10.

Alaska Aces 

The Alaska Aces are the Blues affiliate in the ECHL.

References

External links 
 2009–10 St. Louis Blues season at ESPN
 2009–10 St. Louis Blues season at Hockey Reference

St. Louis Blues seasons
S
S
St Louis
St Louis